Bank Zero, registered with the South African Reserve Bank in 2018, is an exclusively digital mutual bank in South Africa. It offers banking to both individuals and businesses. Bank Zero joins other new banks in South Africa, such as TymeBank and Discovery Bank. Despite an original planned soft launch at the end of 2019, the bank is as of June 2021, conducting a closed rollout with beta testing, with a proposed launch date in mid-2021.

History 

In 2018, Bank Zero was co-founded with a few former First National Bank employees. The bank is 45% black-owned and 20% female-owned. Instead of outsourcing traditional pre-ready banking packages, Bank Zero relies on a core banking platform. By the end of 2018, after integration with the South African Reserve Bank, Bank Zero was a full settlement bank. In early 2019, Bank Zero integrated into the rest of the national payments system to become a full clearing bank with an independent licence. At the end of 2019, Bank Zero was officially certified by the South African Reserve Bank and Mastercard to issue and process debit cards.

Bank Zero had originally planned to soft launch some of its products at the end of 2019, but decided to delay its launch to 2020. The launch has been delayed further and, as of January 2021, hopes to be open to the public by mid-2021. The bank currently adheres to prudency with their capital and does not offer credit.

Security

Mainframe 
Bank Zero uses IBM Z mainframe computers and LinuxONE, as a secure platform that can protect against data breaches with IBM's Secure Service Container.

Debit card 
In November 2019, a patented debit card obtained with an agreement with MasterCard, combined with in-house patented security procedures, operate on the latest Mastercard EMV technology and multi-layered security protocols. Instead of storing the card number that is embossed on the card on both the magnetic stripe, and in the card chip, the debit card would have three different card numbers for each: the embossed number, the magnetic strip, and the card chip. This would allow Bank Zero to limit specific types of transactions to each card number. For example, the magnetic strip card number could only be used at an ATM and at a point-of-sale terminal; the card chip card number could only be used at point-of-sale devices; and, the embossed number could only be used for online transactions.

The bank said, "[this] will dramatically minimise the negative impact of card data theft and card skimming," allowing for a claimed virtually secure card.

References 

Online banks
Banks of South Africa
Banks established in 2018
Companies based in Johannesburg
South African companies established in 2018